Dimosthenis -or Dimos- Magginas is a Greek middle-distance and long-distance runner. He was born on the 25th of June 1982 in Komotini and resides in Athens. Since December 2016 he competes for A.O. Mykonos.

He is a 3 times Panhellenic champion in 5000 metres, 7 times Panhellenic champion in 10000metres and has won 5 times the first place for the 10000 meters cross country individual competition.

References

1982 births
Living people
Greek male long-distance runners
Panathinaikos Athletics
Sportspeople from Alexandroupolis
Greek male middle-distance runners